Josh Schuberth (born 23 September 1983) is an Australian producer, audio engineer, and multi-instrumentalist. His list of credits includes work with numerous notable performers, including Ben Folds, Josh Pyke, Alex Lloyd, Jessica Mauboy, Sara Storer, Graeme Connors, Lenka, Melanie Horsnell, Jenny Queen, Suzy Connolly, Tim Freedman, Greg Storer, and the bands Peregrine and The Sleep-ins. He also records as a solo performer under the name Miracle Pill.

Discography

Notes

External links
 Josh Schuberth website http://www.joshschuberth.com

Australian record producers
Australian musicians
1983 births
Living people